John Covert Boyd (December 24, 1850 – July 7, 1927) was a surgeon and medical director in the United States Navy Medical Corps. He is one of the incorporators of the American Red Cross and one of the founders of the Kappa Sigma Fraternity.

Biography
John Covert Boyd was born on 24 December 1850 near Bradford Springs, South Carolina and spent his youth at the private schools of Charleston. From 1869 to 1871, he attended the University of Virginia. While there, he founded the Kappa Sigma fraternity with four other friends on December 10, 1869: William Grigsby McCormick, Edmund Law Rogers Jr., Frank Courtney Nicodemus, and George Miles Arnold. After Boyd's second year, in which he entered the medical program, he transferred to the University of the City of New York. After graduating as a Doctor of Medicine, Boyd was appointed as an assistant surgeon in the Navy medical corp, eventually rising to the rank of Medical Director. In 1902, he became a professor in the Navy Medical College, Washington, where he was second in seniority. Under supervision of the Surgeon-General of the Navy, Boyd compiled a book of instructions for medical officers. In 1905, President Roosevelt appointed Boyd to be one of the members of the Board of Incorporators of the American Red Cross. He died on 7 July 1927 and is buried in Arlington National Cemetery.

Personal life
Boyd's father was William Simms Boyd, who was a graduate of South Carolina Medical College and his mother was Laura Nelson (Covert) Boyd. In 1887, he married Katherine Dorr Willard and had two children, Alice and Walter. They resided in Washington, D. C.

Legacy
 Fellow of the New York Academy of Medicine
 Member of the Association of Military Surgeons of the United States
 Member of the American Medical Association
 Member of the Philadelphia Academy of Natural Sciences
 Member of the Archaeological Institution of America 
 Honorary member of the Medical Society of the District of Columbia

References

1850 births
1924 deaths
People from Lee County, South Carolina
University of Virginia alumni
New York University Grossman School of Medicine alumni
Kappa Sigma founders
United States Navy Medical Corps officers
American Red Cross personnel
American surgeons
Burials at Arlington National Cemetery